Map24 was a free online mapping service, providing street level maps and driving directions for many parts of the world. Map24 was taken offline on September 15, 2011. www.map24.com was pointing to here.com. However, the Web Archive has archived Map24 website and it is fully functional, as the former original. Map24 was owned and operated by Mapsolute GmbH, a producer of geographic software until they were acquired in 2007 by NAVTEQ, now called HERE. The website had five million users in Germany and 150 million monthly page views.

The service was powered by a company-owned technology called MapTP which offers features like a 3-D route flight and complete interactivity with each map.

Areas covered by Map24
 Asia
 Bahrain
 Kuwait
 Oman
 Qatar
 Saudi Arabia
 United Arab Emirates
 Europe
 Andorra
 Austria
 Belgium
 Denmark
 Finland
 France
 Germany
 Hungary
 Iceland
 Ireland
 Italy
 Liechtenstein
 Luxembourg
 Monaco
 Netherlands
 Norway
 Poland
 Portugal
 Romania
 San Marino
 Slovakia
 Slovenia
 Spain
 Sweden
 Switzerland
 Turkey (Istanbul, Ankara, Izmir)
 United Kingdom
 Vatican City
 North America
 Canada
 Mexico
 Puerto Rico
 United States
 Oceania
 Australia
 New Zealand
 South America
 Brazil

References

Web mapping
Defunct websites